Jhalandhar Araiyan (Urdu جالندھر آرائیاں ) is a village located 42 km from Faisalabad, Pakistan. It has an elevation of 176 meters above sea level. The full name of the village is Chak No. 267 R B Jhalandhar Araiyan.

The total population of the village is 12000+ and total houses are 1500. Facilities like electricity, gas, telephone, water, cable, schools, and Internet are available. Residents are all Punjabi, as is their language. It has a central hospital and a mosque named “Bilal Masjid”. The main source of income for the people is farming and cultivation. There are fields of sugarcane, wheat, rice, and a poultry farm as well.

References

Villages in Faisalabad District